Somebody Somewhere is the twenty-eighth solo studio album by American country music singer-songwriter Loretta Lynn. It was released on October 4, 1976, by MCA Records.

Commercial performance 
The album peaked at No. 1 on the Billboard Top Country Albums chart, Lynn's sixth solo album to top the chart. The album's single, "Somebody Somewhere (Don't Know What He's Missin' Tonight)" peaked at No. 1 on the Billboard Hot Country Songs chart, Lynn's ninth solo single to top the chart.

Recording 
Recording sessions for the album took place on June 28, June 29 and 30, 1976 at Bradley's Barn in Mount Juliet, TN. Six of the album's ten track were from previous recording sessions. The earliest recording featured on the album, "While He's Making Love (I'm Making Believe)", was recorded on January 19, 1972, during a session for 1972's One's on the Way. "Blue Eyed Kentucky Girl" was the second song to be released from a session on March 5, 1973. "Crawling Man" and "Me and Ole Crazy Bill" were recorded on June 18 and 19, 1974, respectively, during sessions for 1974's They Don't Make 'Em Like My Daddy. "Playing with Fire", recorded on January 31, 1975, and "The Games That Daddies Play", recorded on April 16, 1975, are the only two songs ever released from their respective sessions.

Track listing

Personnel 
Adapted from album liner notes.
Bobby Bradley – engineer
Harold Bradley – bass guitar
Owen Bradley – producer
Ray Edenton – rhythm guitar
Darrell Johnson – mastering
Grady Martin – lead guitar
Joe Mills – engineer
Charlie McCoy – harmonica
Bob Moore – bass
Hargus "Pig" Robbins – piano
Hal Rugg – steel guitar

Charts

Weekly charts

Year-end charts

Singles

References 

1976 albums
Loretta Lynn albums
MCA Records albums